Grand Bois may refer to:

Grand Bois, Mauritius, a village in the district of Savanne, Mauritius (see List of places in Mauritius)
Grand Bois (loa), an elemental, nature-oriented loa (Voodoo spirit)
Grand Bois National Park, a national park in Haiti
Col de Grand Bois, a mountain pass in the Rhône-Alpes region, France

See also
Grand-Blois, a village in Haiti
Petit Bois (disambiguation)